Singdam Yokkao Saenchaigym, formerly known as Singdam Kiatmuukao (สิงห์ดำ เกียรติหมู่9), is a Muay Thai fighter from Thailand. He is a Lumpinee Stadium champion, and is known for his powerful right kicks and technical fighting.

Biography

Early career

Singdam is from Buriram in the Northeast part of Thailand. He began fighting at the age of nine and just one year later began training at the Kiatmuu9 gym, where he's been ever since.

2002–2005
In 2002 he beat Orono Wor Petchpun at Lumpinee Boxing Stadium for the title Featherweight champion of Thailand. Shortly after he was awarded with the sports writers of Thailand fighters of the year. In 2004 he beat Yodsanklai Fairtex, then fought Anuwat Kaewsamrit in a fight that would determine who would win the same award, but this time he was KO'd by a punch. Despite the loss he still managed to win Lumpinee fighter of the year. In 2005 he fought Saenchai PKSaenchaimuaythaigym, and won a decision. The two would meet three more times in the ensuing year and Singdam was defeated each time.

2006–2009
In 2006 Singdam continued his rivalry with Orono, with Singdam winning two of the three fights. In 2007 he fought Jomthong Chuwattana at Lumpinee stadium where he won on points. In 2008 he started a new rivalry, this time with Nong-O Sit Or and Singdam would win the first fight between them. In 2009 he fought Lerdsila Chumpairtour and won a decision

2010–present
At the beginning of 2010 he fought in Japan against Nong-O Sit Or. After five rounds the bout was ruled a draw, and was extended to a 6th round. After the extension round Singdam was ruled the winner. Singdam and Nong-O fought two more times in 2010, with Nong-O winning both. In 2011 he matched up with Sagetdao Petpayathai twice, and losing both times. At the annual Lumpinee Boxing Stadium birthday show in December Singdam was matched against F16 Rachanon and he won by TKO at the end of round four after F-16 was unable to continue from because of damage caused to his arm. In 2012 Singdam once again fought Nong-O Sit Or to start off the year, and this time he lost. On June 8 Singdam fought Wanchalerm Uddonmuang for the title of Lumpinee Boxing Stadium and won a decision. July 6 he knocked out Watcharachai Rachanon to retain his championship. On September 8 he defended his Lumpini title by beating Saenchai PKSaenchaimuaythaigym in one of the most anticipated fights of the year.

He rematched Saenchai PKSaenchaimuaythaigym on October 4, 2012 at Rajadamnern, and lost by decision.

Singdam lost a decision to Lumpinee 130 lb champion Yodwicha Por Boonsit on February 7, 2013.

He rematched Sagetdao Phetphayathai at Lumpinee on March 8, 2013 and won on points.

He beat Petchboonchu FA Group on points at Lumpinee on May 10, 2013.

He lost to Nong-O Kaiyanghadaogym on points in a Lumpinee lightweight title fight on June 7, 2013. They rematched on July 12, 2013, with Singdam winning on points and reclaiming his belt.

Singdam lost to Yodwicha Por Boonsit on points in a rematch at Rajadamnern on August 8, 2013.

He lost to Saenchai PKSaenchaimuaythaigym by decision at Yokkao 5 in Pattaya, Thailand on November 15, 2013.

YOKKAO Boxing announced on Twitter that Singdam officially changed his fighting name and will fight under his new name, Singdam YOKKAOSaenchaiGym on September 2, 2017. He is currently under YOKKAO management and trains at the YOKKAO Training Center in Bangkok.

On 27 July, Singdam fought Craig Coakley for the WBC Muay Thai Super-lightweight Diamond title at YOKKAO 42 in Dublin, Ireland. He became the third fighter in history to win the WBC Diamond title which has only been held by two fighters so far, namely, Buakaw Banchamek and Saenchai. The win for Singdam was surrounded by speculation as to how the judges scored the bout. Under WBC rules all strikes count the same as opposed to traditional Muay Thai rules where kicks score higher than punches. Coakley took this rule set and capitalised on it by mainly boxing and Singdam mainly using his trademark right kick. Many experts and spectators vow that Coakley was the superior fighter on the night and landed a significant number of strikes more than Singdam.

Titles and accomplishments

Muay Thai
World Boxing Council Muaythai
 2019 WBC Muay Thai Diamond World Super-Lightweight Champion

Professional Boxing Association of Thailand (PAT)
 2002 Thailand 126 lbs Champion
 2005 Thailand 130 lbs Champion
 2013 Thailand 135 lbs Champion

Toyota Marathon
 2001 Toyota Marathon Tournament 115 lbs Champion
 2014 Toyota Marathon Tournament 140 lbs Champion

Lumpinee Stadium
 2003 Lumpinee Stadium Fighter of the Year
 2005 Lumpinee Stadium 130 lbs Champion
 2012 Lumpinee Stadium 135 lbs Champion (2 defenses)
 2013 Lumpinee Stadium 135 lbs Champion
 2014 Lumpinee Stadium 140 lbs Champion

Awards
 2002 Sports Writers Association of Thailand Fighter of the Year
 2003 sports Authority of Thailand Fighter of the Year
 2004 Sports Writers Association of Thailand Fight of the Year (vs. Anuwat Kaewsamrit)

Kickboxing
Kunlun Fight
2017 Kunlun Fight 4-Man 66kg tournament Runner-Up

Muay Thai record

|-
|- style="background:#fbb;"
| 2022-06-18|| Loss|| align="left" | Hu Zheng  || Battle Time Championship || China || KO (Right cross)|| 3 || 

|- style="background:#cfc;"
| 2020-01-25|| Win || align="left" | Christian Zahe || YOKKAO 45 ||Turin, Italy || Decision || 5 || 3:00
|-
|- style="background:#cfc;"
| 2019-11-30|| Win || align="left" | Cristian Faustino || YOKKAO Fight Night ||Bologna, Italy || Decision || 5 || 3:00
|-
|- style="background:#cfc;"
| 2019-07-27|| Win || align="left" | Craig Coakley || YOKKAO 42 ||Ireland || Decision || 5 || 3:00
|-
! style=background:white colspan=9 |
|-
|- style="background:#cfc;"
| 2019-05-25|| Win || align="left" | Alexi Petroulias || YOKKAO 39 ||Australia || Decision || 5 || 3:00
|-
|- style="background:#cfc;"
| 2019-01-26|| Win || align="left" | Jeremy Payet || YOKKAO 35 ||Italy ||TKO (Referee Stoppage/ 3 Knockdowns) || 2 || 2:58
|-
|- style="background:#cfc;"
| 2018-12-15|| Win ||align=left| Pu Dongdong || Emei Legend 35 ||China || TKO (Doctor Stoppage/ Arm Injured by Kicks)|| 2 || 3:00
|-
|- style="background:#cfc;"
| 2018-10-29|| Win ||align=left| Mathias Jonsson || YOKKAO 33 ||Hong Kong || Decision || 3 || 3:00
|-
|-style="background:#fbc;"
|2018-05-26 ||Loss ||align=left| Tie Yinghua ||2018 in Glory of Heroes#Glory of Heroes 31|Glory of Heroes 31 ||Beijing, China ||KO (Spinning Hook Kick) ||1 ||
|- style="background:#cfc;"
|-
|- style="background:#cfc;"
|2018-03-10 || Win ||align=left| Jack Kennedy || YOKKAO 30 || United Kingdom || Decision (Unanimous)  || 5 || 3:00
|-
|- style="background:#cfc;"
| 2018-02-03 || Win ||align=left| Xie Lei || Wu Lin Feng 2018: World Championship in Shenzhen  || Shenzhen, China || Extra Round Decision (Unanimous)  || 4 || 3:00
|-
|-style="background:#fbc;"
| 2017-11-12 || Loss ||align=left| Yang Zhuo  || Kunlun Fight 67 - 66kg World Championship, Final || Sanya, China || Decision (1-2) || 3 || 3:00
|-
|- style="background:#cfc;"
| 2017-11-12 || Win ||align=left| Pan Jiayun || Kunlun Fight 67 - 66kg World Championship, Semi Finals || Sanya, China || Decision (4-1) || 3 || 3:00
|-
|- style="background:#cfc;"
| 2017-11-12 || Win ||align=left| Takhmasib Kerimov || Kunlun Fight 67 - 66kg World Championship, Quarter Finals || Sanya, China || TKO (broken arm caused by kick) || 3 ||
|-
|-style="background:#fbc;"
|2017-09-11 ||Loss ||align=left| Kazbek Kabulov ||Yokkao 25 ||Hong Kong ||KO ||1 ||
|- style="background:#cfc;"
|2017-08-27 || Win ||align=left| Ali Makhi || Kunlun Fight 65 || Qingdao, China || Decision ||3 ||3:00
|-  style="background:#cfc;"
| 2017-06-10 || Win ||align=left| Gu Hui || Kunlun Fight 62  || Bangkok, Thailand || Decision (Unanimous) || 3 || 3:00 
|-  style="background:#cfc;"
| 2016-10-21||Win ||align=left| He Biao || Superstar Fight 6 || China || Decision (Unanimous) || 3 || 3:00
|-  style="background:#cfc;"
| 2016-09-23||Win ||align=left| Phosa Nopphorn || Superstar Fight 5 || Beijing, China || TKO || 3 || 0:00
|-
! style=background:white colspan=9 |
|-  style="background:#cfc;"
| 2016-09-23||Win ||align=left| Liu Yong || Superstar Fight 5 || Beijing, China || Decision (Unanimous) || 3 || 3:00
|-  style="background:#cfc;"
| 2016-08-27||Win ||align=left| Jake Moulden || Dynamite Muay Thai || Melbourne, Australia || Decision || 5 || 3:00
|-  style="background:#cfc;"
| 2016-07-02||Win ||align=left| Zhang Shuai || Superstar Fight 4 || Shenzhen, China || KO || 2 || 1:32
|-  style="background:#cfc;"
| 2016-05-21||Win ||align=left| Li Chenchen || Superstar Fight 3 || Harbin, China || Decision (Unanimous) || 3 || 3:00
|-  style="background:#cfc;"
| 2016-04-16||Win ||align=left| Zheng Ke || Superstar Fight 2 || Hunan, China || TKO || 2 || 
|-  style="background:#cfc;"
| 2016-02-27 ||Win ||align=left| Zhang Chenglong || Superstar Fight 1 || China || TKO (broken arm caused by kick)  || 1 || 3:00
|-  style="background:#fbc;"
| 2015-12-08 || Loss ||align=left| Chamuakthong Sor.Yupinda || Lumpinee Stadium || Bangkok, Thailand || Decision || 5 || 3:00
|-
! style=background:white colspan=9 |
|-  style="background:#cfc;"
| 2015-10-10 ||Win ||align=left| Liam Harrison || Yokkao 15 || England || Decision || 5 || 3:00
|-  style="background:#fbc;"
| 2015-09-09 || Loss ||align=left| Manasak Sitniwat || Rajadamnern Stadium || Bangkok, Thailand || Decision || 5 || 
|-  style="background:#fbc;"
| 2015-06-19 || Loss ||align=left| Azize Hlali || Best of Siam 6 || France || Decision || 5 || 3:00
|-  style="background:#fbc;"
| 2015-03-06 || Loss ||align=left| Manasak Sitniwat || Lumpinee Stadium || Bangkok, Thailand || TKO (Punch) || 4 || 
|-  style="background:#fbc;"
| 2014-10-31 || Loss ||align=left| Petchboonchu FA Group || Toyota tournament || Thailand || Decision || 3 || 3:00
|-  style="background:#cfc;"
| 2014-09-05 || Win ||align=left| Saensatharn P.K. Saenchai Muaythaigym || Lumpinee Stadium || Bangkok, Thailand || Decision || 5 || 3:00
|-
! style=background:white colspan=9 |
|-  style="background:#cfc;"
| 2014-05-30 || Win ||align=left| Saenchai PKSaenchaimuaythaigym || Toyota Marathon Final || Surat Thani,Thailand || Decision || 3 || 3:00
|-
! style=background:white colspan=9 |
|-  style="background:#cfc;"
| 2014-05-30 || Win ||align=left| Jayy Tonkin || Toyota Marathon Semi Final || Surat Thani,Thailand || KO (knee to body) || 2 ||
|-  style="background:#cfc;"
| 2014-05-30 || Win ||align=left| John Giib || Toyota Marathon Quarter Final || Surat Thani,Thailand || KO (head kick) || 1 || 
|-  style="background:#fbc;"
| 2014-05-08 || Loss ||align=left| Nong-O Kaiyanghadaogym || Rajadamnern Stadium || Bangkok, Thailand || Decision || 5 || 3:00
|-
! style=background:white colspan=9 |
|-  style="background:#cfc;"
| 2014-03-30 || Win ||align=left| Chamuaktong Sor.Yupinda || Charity Event for School || Songkhla, Southern Thailand || Decision || 5 || 3:00
|-  style="background:#fbc;"
| 2014-02-28 || Loss ||align=left| Pakorn PKSaenchaimuaythaigym || Grand Opening of New Lumpinee Stadium || Bangkok, Thailand || Decision || 3 || 3:00
|-
! style=background:white colspan=9 |
|-  style="background:#cfc;"
| 2014-01-07 || Win ||align=left| Kongsak sitboonmee || Lumpinee Stadium || Bangkok, Thailand || Decision || 5 || 3:00
|-  style="background:#fbc;"
| 2013-11-17 ||Loss ||align=left| Saenchai PKSaenchaimuaythaigym || Yokkao 5 || Pattaya, Thailand || Decision ||  || 
|-  style="background:#fbc;"
| 2013-10-11 || Loss ||align=left| Petchboonchu FA Group || Lumpinee Stadium || Bangkok, Thailand || Decision || 5 || 3:00
|-
! style=background:white colspan=9 |
|-  style="background:#cfc;"
| 2013-09-04 || Win ||align=left| Chamuaktong Sor.Yupinda || Rajadamnern Stadium || Bangkok, Thailand || Decision || 5 || 3:00
|-  style="background:#fbc;"
| 2013-08-08 || Loss ||align=left| Yodwicha Por Boonsit || Rajadamnern Stadium || Bangkok, Thailand || Decision || 5 || 3:00
|-  style="background:#cfc;"
| 2013-07-12 || Win ||align=left| Nong-O Kaiyanghadaogym || Lumpinee Stadium || Bangkok, Thailand || Decision || 5 || 3:00
|-
! style=background:white colspan=9 |
|-  style="background:#fbc;"
| 2013-06-07 || Loss ||align=left| Nong-O Kaiyanghadaogym || Lumpinee Stadium || Bangkok, Thailand || Decision || 5 || 3:00
|-
! style=background:white colspan=9 |
|-  style="background:#cfc;"
| 2013-05-10 || Win ||align=left| Petchboonchu FA Group || Lumpinee Stadium || Bangkok, Thailand || Decision || 5 || 3:00
|-  style="background:#cfc;"
| 2013-03-08 || Win ||align=left| Sagetdao Phetphayathai || Lumpinee Stadium || Bangkok, Thailand || Decision || 5 || 3:00
|-  style="background:#fbc;"
| 2013-02-07 || Loss ||align=left| Yodwicha Por Boonsit || Rajadamnern Stadium || Bangkok, Thailand || Decision  || 5 || 3:00
|-  style="background:#cfc;"
| 2013-01-04 || Win ||align=left| Saenchai PKSaenchaimuaythaigym || Lumpinee Stadium || Bangkok, Thailand || Decision || 5 || 3:00
|-  style="background:#cfc;"
| 2012-12-07 || Win ||align=left| Wanchalerm Uddonmuang || Lumpinee Stadium || Bangkok, Thailand || Decision || 5 || 3:00
|-  style="background:#fbc;"
| 2012-10-04 || Loss ||align=left| Saenchai PKSaenchaimuaythaigym || Rajadamnern Stadium || Bangkok, Thailand || Decision || 5 || 3:00
|-  style="background:#cfc;"
| 2012-09-07 || Win ||align=left| Saenchai PKSaenchaimuaythaigym || Lumpinee Stadium || Bangkok, Thailand || Decision || 5 || 3:00
|-
! style=background:white colspan=9 |
|-  style="background:#cfc;"
| 2012-07-31 || Win ||align=left| Nong-O Sit Or || Lumpinee Stadium || Bangkok, Thailand || Decision || 5 || 3:00
|-
! style=background:white colspan=9 |
|-  style="background:#cfc;"
| 2012-07-06 || Win ||align=left| Watcharachai Rachanon || Lumpinee Stadium || Bangkok, Thailand || KO (knee) || 3 || 
|-  style="background:#cfc;"
| 2012-06-08 || Win ||align=left| Wanchalerm Uddonmuang || Lumpinee Stadium || Bangkok, Thailand || Decision || 5 || 3:00
|-
! style=background:white colspan=9 |
|-  style="background:#cfc;"
| 2012-05-04 || Win ||align=left| Nong-O Sit Or || Lumpinee Stadium || Bangkok, Thailand || Decision || 5 || 3:00
|-  style="background:#cfc;"
| 2012-04-03 || Win ||align=left| Sagetdao Petpayathai || Lumpinee Stadium || Bangkok, Thailand || Decision || 5 || 3:00
|-  style="background:#c5d2ea;"
| 2012-03-09 || Draw ||align=left| Wanchalerm Uddonmuang || Lumpinee Stadium || Bangkok, Thailand || Decision || 5 || 3:00
|-  style="background:#fbc;"
| 2012-02-03 || Loss ||align=left| Nong-O Sit Or || Lumpinee Stadium || Bangkok, Thailand || Decision || 5 || 3:00
|-  style="background:#cfc;"
| 2011-12-09 || Win ||align=left| F-16 Rachanon || Lumpinee Stadium || Bangkok, Thailand || TKO (kicks) || 4 || 3:00
|-  style="background:#fbc;"
| 2011-- || Loss ||align=left| Nong-O Sit Or || Southern Thailand || Koh Samui, Thailand || Decision || 5 || 3:00
|-  style="background:#cfc;"
| 2011-10-07 || Win ||align=left| Petchboonchu FA Group || Lumpinee Stadium || Bangkok, Thailand || Decision || 5 || 3:00
|-  style="background:#fbc;"
| 2011-09-06 || Loss ||align=left| Sagetdao Petpayathai || Lumpinee Stadium || Bangkok, Thailand || Decision || 5 || 3:00
|-  style="background:#fbc;"
| 2011-08-02 || Loss ||align=left| Petchboonchu FA Group || Lumpinee Stadium || Bangkok, Thailand || Decision || 5 || 3:00
|-  style="background:#cfc;"
| 2011-07-07 || Win ||align=left| Sittisak Petpayathai || Rajadamnern Stadium || Bangkok, Thailand || Decision || 5 || 3:00
|-  style="background:#fbc;"
| 2011-06-10 || Loss ||align=left| Petchboonchu FA Group || Lumpinee Stadium || Bangkok, Thailand || Decision || 5 || 3:00
|-  style="background:#cfc;"
| 2011-05-05 || Win ||align=left| Sagetdao Petpayathai || Rajadamnern Stadium || Bangkok, Thailand || Decision || 5 || 3:00
|-  style="background:#cfc;"
| 2011-03-08 || Win ||align=left| Tukatong Petpaiyathai || Lumpinee Stadium || Bangkok, Thailand || Decision || 5 || 3:00
|-  style="background:#cfc;"
| 2011-02-15 || Win ||align=left| Sittisak Petpayathai || Lumpinee Stadium || Bangkok, Thailand || Decision || 5 || 3:00
|-  style="background:#cfc;"
| 2010-12-29 || Win ||align=left| Chameuktong Looklongtun || Rajadamnern Stadium || Bangkok, Thailand || Decision || 5 || 3:00
|-  style="background:#fbc;"
| 2010-10-05 || Loss ||align=left| Superbon Lookjaomaesaivaree || Lumpinee Stadium || Bangkok, Thailand || Decision || 5 || 3:00
|-  style="background:#cfc;"
| 2010-08-01 || Win ||align=left| Orono Wor Petchpun || Muay Lok 2010 Grand Stage || Tokyo, Japan || Decision (Majority) || 5 || 3:00
|-  style="background:#fbc;"
| 2010-07-13 || Loss ||align=left| Nong-O Sit Or || Lumpinee Stadium || Bangkok, Thailand || Decision || 5 || 3:00
|-  style="background:#fbc;"
| 2010-04-02 || Loss ||align=left| Nong-O Sit Or || Lumpinee Stadium || Bangkok, Thailand || Decision || 5 || 3:00
|-  style="background:#cfc;"
| 2010-03-05 || Win ||align=left| Superball Lookjaomaesaivaree || Lumpinee Stadium || Bangkok, Thailand || Decision || 5 || 3:00
|-  style="background:#fbc;"
| 2010-02-09 || Loss ||align=left| Superball Lookjaomaesaivaree || Lumpinee Stadium || Bangkok, Thailand || Decision || 5 || 3:00
|-  style="background:#cfc;"
| 2010-01-17 || Win ||align=left| Nong-O Sit Or || || Koto, Tokyo, Japan || Decision || 5 || 3:00
|-  style="background:#cfc;"
| 2009-12-19 || Win ||align=left| Lerdsila Chumpairtour || Lumpinee Stadium || Bangkok, Thailand || Decision || 5 || 3:00

|-  style="background:#fbc;"
| 2009-10-31 || Loss ||align=left| Panpet Chor Na Pattalung ||  || Nong Khai province, Thailand || Decision || 5 || 3:00
|-
! style=background:white colspan=9 |

|-  style="background:#cfc;"
| 2009-09-12 || Win ||align=left| Tuantong Pumphanmuang || Lumpinee Stadium || Bangkok, Thailand || Decision || 5 || 3:00
|-  style="background:#cfc;"
| 2009-06-13 || Win ||align=left| Pettanong Petfergus || Lumpinee Stadium || Bangkok, Thailand || Decision || 5 || 3:00
|-  style="background:#c5d2ea;"
| 2009-05-22 || Draw ||align=left| Nong-O Sit Or || Lumpinee Stadium || Bangkok, Thailand || Decision || 5 || 3:00
|-  style="background:#cfc;"
| 2009-04-25 || Win ||align=left| Kaew Fairtex || Lumpinee Stadium || Bangkok, Thailand || Decision || 5 || 3:00
|-  style="background:#cfc;"
| 2008-12-13 || Win ||align=left| Kaew Fairtex || Lumpinee Stadium || Bangkok, Thailand || Decision || 5 || 3:00
|-  style="background:#cfc;"
| 2008-10-03 || Win ||align=left| Longern Por Muangthungsong || Lumpinee Stadium || Bangkok, Thailand || Decision || 5 || 3:00
|-  style="background:#fbc;"
| 2008-06-24 || Loss ||align=left| Saenchainoi Pumphanmuang || Lumpinee Stadium || Bangkok, Thailand || Decision || 5 || 3:00
|-  style="background:#cfc;"
| 2008-05-30 || Win ||align=left| Nong-O Sit Or || Lumpinee Stadium || Bangkok, Thailand || Decision || 5 || 3:00
|-  style="background:#cfc;"
| 2008-04-29 || Win ||align=left| Petchmankong Petfergus || Lumpinee Stadium || Bangkok, Thailand || Decision || 5 || 3:00
|-  style="background:#cfc;"
| 2008-03-18 || Win ||align=left| Yodbuangam Lukbanyai || Lumpinee Stadium || Bangkok, Thailand || Decision || 5 || 3:00
|-  style="background:#fbc;"
| 2008-02-12 || Loss ||align=left| Puangsompong Kor Sapaotong || Lumpinee Stadium || Bangkok, Thailand || Decision || 5 || 3:00
|-  style="background:#cfc;"
| 2007-12-04 || Win ||align=left| Petchmankong Sit Or || Lumpinee Stadium || Bangkok, Thailand || Decision || 5 || 3:00
|-  style="background:#cfc;"
| 2007-11-02 || Win ||align=left| Petaskin Sor Trumpet || Lumpinee Stadium || Bangkok, Thailand || Decision || 5 || 3:00
|-  style="background:#fbc;"
| 2007-07-03 || Loss ||align=left| Nopparat Keatkhamtorn || Lumpinee Stadium || Bangkok, Thailand || Decision || 5 || 3:00
|-  style="background:#cfc;"
| 2007-05-22 || Win ||align=left| Jomthong Chuwattana || Lumpinee Stadium || Bangkok, Thailand || Decision || 5 || 3:00
|-  style="background:#cfc;"
| 2007-04-03 || Win ||align=left| Attachai Fairtex || Lumpinee Stadium || Bangkok, Thailand || Decision || 5 || 3:00
|-  style="background:#cfc;"
| 2007-02-27 || Win ||align=left| Duangsompong Kor Sapaotong || Lumpinee Stadium || Bangkok, Thailand || Decision || 5 || 3:00
|-  style="background:#cfc;"
| 2007-01-12 || Win ||align=left| Duangsompong Kor Sapaotong || Lumpinee Stadium || Bangkok, Thailand || Decision || 5 || 3:00
|-  style="background:#cfc;"
| 2006-12-22 || Win ||align=left| Orono Wor Petchpun || Lumpinee Stadium || Bangkok, Thailand || Decision || 5 || 3:00
|-  style="background:#fbb;"
| 2006-11-17 || Loss ||align=left| Kongpipop Petchyindee || Gaiyanghadao Tournament, Quarter Final || Nakhon Ratchasima, Thailand || Decision || 3||3:00
|-  style="background:#fbc;"
| 2006-10-06 || Loss ||align=left| Sakadpetch Ingramgym || Lumpinee Stadium || Bangkok, Thailand || Decision || 5 || 3:00
|-  style="background:#fbc;"
| 2006-09-01 || Loss ||align=left| Orono Wor Petchpun || Lumpinee Stadium || Bangkok, Thailand || Decision || 5 || 3:00
|-  style="background:#fbb;"
| 2006-08-08 || Loss||align=left| Attachai Fairtex || Fairtex, Lumpinee Stadium || Bangkok, Thailand || Decision || 5 || 3:00
|-  style="background:#fbc;"
| 2006-07-14 || Loss ||align=left| Nopparat Keatkhamtorn || Lumpinee Stadium || Bangkok, Thailand || Decision || 5 || 3:00
|-
! style=background:white colspan=9 |

|-  style="background:#cfc;"
| 2006-05-05 || Win ||align=left| Orono Wor Petchpun || Lumpinee Stadium || Bangkok, Thailand || Decision || 5 || 3:00
|-  style="background:#fbc;"
| 2006-03-24 || Loss ||align=left| Saenchai Sinbimuaythai || Lumpinee Stadium || Bangkok, Thailand || Decision || 5 || 3:00
|-  style="background:#cfc;"
| 2006-02-10 || Win ||align=left| Attachai Fairtex || Lumpinee Stadium || Bangkok, Thailand || Decision || 5 || 3:00
|-  style="background:#fbc;"
| 2005-12-09 || Loss ||align=left| Saenchai Sinbimuaythai || Lumpinee Stadium || Bangkok, Thailand || Decision || 5 || 3:00
|-  style="background:#cfc;"
| 2005-11-15 || Win ||align=left| Kongpipop Petchyindee || Lumpinee Stadium || Bangkok, Thailand || Decision || 5 || 3:00
|-  style="background:#cfc;"
| 2005-10-21 || Win ||align=left| Nopparat Keatkhamtorn || Lumpinee Stadium || Bangkok, Thailand || Decision || 5 || 3:00
|-  style="background:#cfc;"
| 2005-09-27 || Win ||align=left| Kaew Fairtex || Lumpinee Stadium || Bangkok, Thailand || Decision || 5 || 3:00
|-  style="background:#fbc;"
| 2005-08-31 || Loss ||align=left| Nopparat Keatkhamtorn || Rajadamnern Stadium || Bangkok, Thailand || Decision || 5 || 3:00
|-  style="background:#fbc;"
| 2005-07-19 || Loss ||align=left| Saenchai Sinbimuaythai || Lumpinee Stadium || Bangkok, Thailand || Decision || 5 || 3:00
|-  style="background:#cfc;"
| 2005-06-10 || Win ||align=left| Saenchai Sinbimuaythai || Lumpinee Stadium || Bangkok, Thailand || Decision || 5 || 3:00
|-  style="background:#cfc;"
| 2005-05-06 || Win ||align=left| Orono Wor Petchpun || Lumpinee Stadium || Bangkok, Thailand || Decision || 5 || 3:00
|-
! style=background:white colspan=9 |
|-  style="background:#fbc;"
| 2005-03-18 || Loss ||align=left| Sakadpetch Sor.Sakulpan|| Lumpinee Stadium || Bangkok, Thailand || Decision || 5 || 3:00
|-  style="background:#cfc;"
| 2005-02-11 || Win ||align=left| Sibmean Lemtongkornpat || Lumpinee Stadium || Bangkok, Thailand || Decision || 5 || 3:00
|-  style="background:#cfc;"
| 2005-01-04 || Win ||align=left| Nopparat Keatkhamtorn || Lumpinee Stadium || Bangkok, Thailand || Decision || 5 || 3:00
|-  style="background:#cfc;"
| 2004-12-07 || Win ||align=left| Sibmean Lemtongkornpat || Lumpinee Stadium || Bangkok, Thailand || Decision || 5 || 3:00
|-  style="background:#cfc;"
| 2004-10-08 || Win ||align=left| Sakadpetch Sor.Sakulpan || Lumpinee Stadium || Bangkok, Thailand || Decision || 5 || 3:00
|-  style="background:#fbc;"
| 2004-09-14 || Loss ||align=left| Orono Wor Petchpun || Lumpinee Stadium || Bangkok, Thailand || Decision || 5 || 3:00
|-  style="background:#fbc;"
| 2004-08-10 || Loss ||align=left| Orono Wor Petchpun || Lumpinee Stadium || Bangkok, Thailand || Decision || 5 || 3:00
|-  style="background:#fbc;"
| 2004-05-04 || Loss ||align=left| Anuwat Kaewsamrit || Lumpinee Stadium || Bangkok, Thailand || TKO || 3 || 
|-  style="background:#cfc;"
| 2004-04-02 || Win ||align=left| Yodsanklai Fairtex || Lumpinee Stadium || Bangkok, Thailand || Decision || 5 || 3:00
|-  style="background:#cfc;"
| 2004-01-24 || Win ||align=left| Kongpipop Petchyindee || Lumpinee Stadium || Bangkok, Thailand || Decision || 5 || 3:00
|-
! style=background:white colspan=9 |
|-  style="background:#cfc;"
| 2003-12-09 || Win ||align=left| Samkor Kiatmontep || Lumpinee Stadium || Bangkok, Thailand || Decision || 5 || 3:00
|-  style="background:#cfc;"
| 2003-11-14 || Win ||align=left| Samkor Kiatmontep || Lumpinee Stadium || Bangkok, Thailand || Decision || 5 || 3:00
|-  style="background:#cfc;"
| 2003-10-10 || Win ||align=left| Nongbee Kiatyongyut || Lumpinee Stadium || Bangkok, Thailand || Decision || 5 || 3:00
|-  style="background:#cfc;"
| 2003-08-22 || Win ||align=left| Orono Wor Petchpun || Lumpinee Stadium || Bangkok, Thailand || Decision || 5 || 3:00
|-  style="background:#cfc;"
| 2003-07-29 || Win ||align=left| Kongpipop Petchyindee || Lumpinee Stadium || Bangkok, Thailand || Decision || 5 || 3:00
|-  style="background:#cfc;"
| 2003-06-07 || Win ||align=left| Chalarmkao Rachanon || Wansongpon, Lumpinee Stadium || Bangkok, Thailand || Decision || 5 || 3:00
|-  style="background:#c5d2ea;"
| 2002-11-29 || Draw||align=left| Ngatao Attharungroj||  Lumpinee Stadium || Bangkok, Thailand || Decision || 5 || 3:00
|-  style="background:#cfc;"
| 2002-12-20 || Win ||align=left| Petchdam Kiatpraphat ||  Lumpinee Stadium || Bangkok, Thailand || Decision || 5 || 3:00
|-  bgcolor="#cfc"
| 2002- || Win||align=left| Orono Wor Petchpun ||  || Bangkok, Thailand || Decision || 5 || 3:00
|-
! style=background:white colspan=9 |
|-  style="background:#cfc;"
| 2002-09-27 || Win ||align=left| Petchmanee Petsupapan ||  Lumpinee Stadium || Bangkok, Thailand || Decision || 5 || 3:00
|-  style="background:#cfc;"
| 2002-06-21 || Win ||align=left| Sakniran Tor.Sittichai ||  Lumpinee Stadium || Bangkok, Thailand || Decision || 5 || 3:00
|-  style="background:#;"
| 2002-03-11 ||  ||align=left| Lerdsila Chumpairtour || Rajadamnern Stadium || Bangkok, Thailand || ||  ||
|-  style="background:#fbb;"
| 2001-12-25 || Loss ||align=left| Lomchoi Chor.Parama6 || Rajadamnern Stadium || Bangkok, Thailand || Decision ||5  ||3:00
|-  style="background:#cfc;"
| 2001-10-29 || Win ||align=left| Kangwanlek Petchyindee ||  Lumpinee Stadium || Bangkok, Thailand || Decision || 5 || 3:00
|-  style="background:#fbb;"
| 2001-09- || Loss||align=left| Kangwanlek Petchyindee ||  Lumpinee Stadium || Bangkok, Thailand || Decision || 5 || 3:00
|-  style="background:#cfc;"
| 2001- || Win ||align=left| Kongdej Kiatprapat || Toyota Marathon, Final|| Thailand || Decision || 3 || 3:00
|-
! style=background:white colspan=9 |
|-
| colspan=9 | Legend:

See also
List of male kickboxers

References

Living people
Featherweight kickboxers
Singdam Kiatmuu9
Singdam Kiatmuu9
1984 births
Kunlun Fight kickboxers